Robert Patrick W. "Nicky" Thompson (born 21 September 1967) is a British former field hockey player who competed in the 1992 Summer Olympics and in the 1996 Summer Olympics. Gained 196 Caps and Scored 56 goals.

References

External links
 

1967 births
Living people
British male field hockey players
Olympic field hockey players of Great Britain
Field hockey players at the 1992 Summer Olympics
Field hockey players at the 1996 Summer Olympics
1998 Men's Hockey World Cup players
Hampstead & Westminster Hockey Club players
1990 Men's Hockey World Cup players